Plotosus lineatus, common name striped eel catfish, is a species of eeltail catfishes belonging to the family Plotosidae.

Description
Plotosus lineatus can reach a maximum length of 32 cm (13 in). The body is brown with cream-colored or white longitudinal bands.

The most striking feature of this species is in the fins, in fact the second dorsal, caudal and anal are fused together as in eels. In the rest of the body is quite similar to a freshwater  catfish: the mouth is surrounded by four pairs of barbels, four on the upper jaw and four on the lower jaw. The first dorsal and each of the pectoral fins have a highly venomous spine. They may even be fatal.

Juveniles of Plotosus lineatus form dense ball-shaped schools of about 100 fish, while adults are solitary or occur in smaller groups of around 20 and are known to hide under ledges during the day. Adult P. lineatus search and stir the sand incessantly for crustaceans, mollusks, worms, and sometimes fish.

P. lineatus is an oviparous fish; this species has demersal eggs and planktonic larvae. It has evolved long ampullary canals in its electrosensory organs (originally termed "ampullae of Lorenzini").

Distribution and habitat
P. lineatus occurs  in the Indian Ocean, in the western Pacific Ocean and is recorded since 2002 in the eastern Mediterranean Sea where it is now common from Levantine waters to the Gulf of Gabes. It sometimes enters freshwaters in East Africa and Madagascar. P. lineatus is found in coral reefs; and is also found in estuaries, tide pools and open coasts.

Invasiveness 
In Europe, P. lineatus is included since 2019 in the list of Invasive Alien Species of Union concern (the Union list). This implies that this species cannot be imported, bred, transported, commercialized, or intentionally released into the environment in the whole of the European Union.

References

Bibliography
 Eschmeyer, William N., ed. 1998. Catalog of Fishes. Special Publication of the Center for Biodiversity Research and Information, núm. 1, vol. 1–3. California Academy of Sciences. San Francisco (California). .
 Fenner, Robert M.: The Conscientious Marine Aquarist. Neptune City, New Jersey: T.F.H. Publications, 2001.
 Helfman, G., B. Collette y D. Facey: The diversity of fishes. Blackwell Science, Malden, Massachusetts, 1997.
 Moyle, P. y J. Cech.: Fishes: An Introduction to Ichthyology, 4a. ed., Upper Saddle River, New Jersey: Prentice-Hall. Año 2000.
 Nelson, J.: Fishes of the World, 3a. ed. New York: John Wiley and Sons. 1994.
 Wheeler, A.: The World Encyclopedia of Fishes, 2a. ed., London: Macdonald. 1985.
 Lieske, E. i R. Myers 1994. Collins Pocket Guide. Coral reef fishes. Indo-Pacific & Caribbean including the Red Sea. HarperCollins Publishers, 400 p.

External links
 Peteducation.com: Plotosus lineatus
 
 Clinical effects of the venom of Plotusus lineatus
 Striped Catfish @ Fishes of Australia

Plotosidae
Catfish of Africa
Catfish of Asia
Catfish of Oceania
Fish of the Red Sea
Marine fauna of East Africa
Marine fish of Southeast Asia
Marine fish of Northern Australia
Venomous fish
Fish described in 1787